Kadaijin Dam  is an earthfill dam located in Miyagi Prefecture in Japan. The dam is used for flood control and irrigation. The catchment area of the dam is 15 km2. The dam impounds about 18  ha of land when full and can store 854 thousand cubic meters of water. The construction of the dam was completed in 1937.

See also
List of dams in Japan

References

Dams in Miyagi Prefecture